Zamia vazquezii is a species of plant in the family Zamiaceae. It is endemic to northern Veracruz state, in eastern Mexico. It is a Critically endangered species, threatened by habitat loss. There are only two wild populations with no more than a combined total of 50 individuals.

References

vazquezii
Endemic flora of Mexico
Flora of Veracruz
Critically endangered plants
Endangered biota of Mexico
Taxonomy articles created by Polbot